John Lyne (7 December 1810 – 14 September 1900) was an Australian politician.

Lyne was born in London in 1810. In 1880 he was elected to the Tasmanian House of Assembly, representing the seat of Glamorgan. He served until 1893. He died in 1900 in Launceston.

References

1810 births
1900 deaths
Members of the Tasmanian House of Assembly